Han Suk-joon (born June 11, 1975) is a South Korean television personality and former announcer. He also appeared in Code - Secret Room in 2016.

Han was previously married to news anchor Kim Mi-jin. He remarried in April 2018. Their daughter was born in October 2018 and briefly appeared on The Return of Superman with her father.

Awards and nominations

References

External links

1975 births
Living people
South Korean announcers
South Korean television personalities
Korea University alumni
Korean Broadcasting System people